Randall Stuart Johnson is a former Major League Baseball designated hitter. He was born on August 15, 1958 in Miami, Florida. He bats and throws left-handed and is 6 foot 2 and 195 pounds. Randy was drafted by the Chicago White Sox in the 3rd round of the 1979 draft. In 1980 for the Chicago White Sox he had 4 hits in 20 at bats (a .200 batting average). In 1982 with the Minnesota Twins, Johnson had 58 hits and 10 home runs. In his career, he had 62 hits, 10 home runs, 36 RBIs, and a .244 batting average.

External links

Major League Baseball designated hitters
Chicago White Sox players
Minnesota Twins players
Baseball players from Florida
1958 births
Living people
San Jose State Spartans baseball players
Appleton Foxes players
Buffalo Bisons (minor league) players
Glens Falls White Sox players
Iowa Oaks players
Rojos del Águila de Veracruz players
Toledo Mud Hens players
American expatriate baseball players in Mexico